Kamyar Kalantar-Zadeh (born October 1963) is an Iranian-American physician doing research in nephrology, kidney dialysis, nutrition, and epidemiology. He is best known as a specialist in kidney disease nutrition and chronic kidney disease and for his hypothesis about the longevity of individuals with chronic disease states, also known as reverse epidemiology including obesity paradox. According to this hypothesis, obesity or hypercholesterolemia may counterintuitively be protective and associated with greater survival in certain groups of people, such as elderly individuals, dialysis patients, or those with chronic disease states and wasting syndrome (cachexia), whereas normal to low body mass index or normal values of serum cholesterol may be detrimental and associated with worse mortality. Kalantar-Zadeh is also known for his expertise in kidney dialysis therapy, including incremental dialysis, as well as renal nutrition. He is the brother of Kourosh Kalantar-zadeh, who an Australian scientist involved in research in the fields of materials sciences, nanotechnology, and transducers.

Education 
Kalantar-Zadeh received his education in medicine from the University of Bochum and University of Bonn (Germany) and his M.D. degree from the University of Erlangen-Nuremberg (Germany). In addition, he obtained a master's degree in public health (Master of Public Health, MPH) and a PhD in epidemiology from the University of California, Berkeley. He is a practicing triple board certified physician specialist in internal medicine, pediatrics, and nephrology. Kalantar-Zadeh completed his residency at the State University of New York and his nephrology fellowship at the University of California, San Francisco.

Career 
Kalantar-Zadeh was a professor of medicine at the David Geffen School of Medicine at UCLA and was based at the Lundquist Institute for Biomedical Innovation at Harbor–UCLA Medical Center (2000-2012), where he worked with his former mentor Joel D. Kopple and served as the founding director of the Harold Simmons Center for Chronic Disease Research and Epidemiology. In 2012 Kalantar-Zadeh moved to the University of California, Irvine School of Medicine as a tenured professor of medicine, pediatrics, public health, and Nursing Sciences, and chief of Nephrology, and the UC Irvine Medical Center. He also serves as a part-time staff physician at Tibor-Rubin VA Medical center in Long Beach, California, under the Veterans Health Administration.  Kalantar-Zadeh has remained an adjunct professor of epidemiology at Fielding UCLA School of Public Health.

Kalantar-Zadeh has authored or coauthored over 800 research articles and reviews, which have been cited over 50,000 times, giving him an h-index of >100. In addition, Kalantar-Zadeh is editor-in-chief of the Journal of Renal Nutrition, and an associate editor of the Journal of Cachexia, Sarcopenia and Muscle, Nephrology Dialysis Transplantation., and Clinical Nutrition, and a member of the editorial boards of the Journal of the American Society of Nephrology, Kidney International, American Journal of Kidney Diseases, Nutrients, and several other peer reviewed journals in Nephrology and Nutrition. Kalantar-Zadeh is the past president of the International Society of Renal Nutrition and Metabolism and the co-chair of the international steering committee of the World Kidney Day.

Kalantar-Zadeh first proposed reverse epidemiology in articles in the journal Kidney International in 2003 and in the Journal of the American College of Cardiology in 2004. It is a contradiction to prevailing concepts of prevention of atherosclerosis and cardiovascular disease. 
In an interview with Nature Magazine in 2016, Kalantar-Zadeh stated that obesity is like “that guy who led you to prison, [but] becomes your friend in prison."

Kalantar-Zadeh has also contributed extensively to the fields of dialysis and kidney disease nutrition including an invited review paper in the New England Journal of Medicine in 2017 on nutritional management of chronic kidney disease, in that he recommends low protein diet for conservative management of chronic kidney disease to delay dialysis initiation but high protein diet for dialysis patients without residual kidney function. Kalantar-Zadeh has published extensively on chronic kidney disease and end-stage renal disease including kidney dialysis with focus on incremental transition to dialysis therapy with initially less frequent hemodialysis treatment.  Kalantar-Zadeh has first-authored three review and perspective articles in the New England Journal of Medicine including a 2013 case records paper on metabolic acidosis due to metformin toxicity, a 2017 renal nutrition review paper., and a 2020 perspective article on ensuring choice for people with kidney failure. as well as a 2021 review paper in The Lancet on kidney preserving therapy in persons with chronic kidney disease.

References

External links 
 UC Irvine Faculty Profile
 Fielding UCLA School of Public Health Profile
 Oxford Journals Bibliography of Kalantar-Zadeh
 World Kidney Day

1963 births
Living people
American nephrologists
American epidemiologists
UCLA School of Public Health faculty
Alborz High School alumni
University of California, San Francisco alumni
UC Berkeley School of Public Health alumni
University of Bonn alumni
University of Erlangen-Nuremberg alumni